The Gay Police Association (GPA) was a British police staff association with members in all 52 UK police forces. The GPA was founded in 1990 by Constable James Bradley as LAGPA (Lesbian And Gay Police Association), and represented the needs and interests of gay and bisexual police officers and police staff in the United Kingdom. Other founding officers were Iain Ferguson, Ashley Wilce and Tony Murphy. The founding of the GPA for England and Wales also inspired satellite organisations in Scotland in 1990 and Northern Ireland in 2003.

Following a General Meeting of the national GPA held on 24 February 2014, the membership voted by more than two-thirds majority (in accordance with article 13 of the constitution) to close the national GPA from 1 April 2014. Much of the history regarding the formation of the Association can be found in "Coming Out Of The Blue" a (Cassell, 1993) book by former Metropolitan police officer and founding LAGPA member Marc Burke. The book is an oral history which documents for the first time the experiences of many gay and lesbian police officers in their own words. It was awarded 'Book of the Year' by Gay Times Magazine. The Association changed its name to Gay Police Association (GPA) following a vote of its membership in 2001.

The UK Association ceased to exist in 2014 after its funding was cut as a result of UK Government austerity measures and a vote taken by the membership, although the GPA had failed to function as a staff support association for several years in advance to this. It was replaced by its successor organisation The National LGBT+ Police network in August 2015. The GPA in Scotland continued as an independent police staff association (similar to the GPA) and receives funding from the Scottish Government. In 2015, GPA Scotland won the Scottish LGBTI Staff Network of the Year Award, the LGBT ICON Community Spirit Award and were finalists in the Pink News LGBT Public Sector Award. In 2016 the GPA Scotland was reformed into the Scottish LGBTI Police Association.

In March 2015 a new group was created, the National LGBT Police Network covering England, Wales and Northern Ireland. This new group is made up of the existing local police force networks, who work in regions and each elect one person to represent them at a regional and subsequently national level.
In 2020 as a result of the annual elections, the first female co-chair was elected in. She works collaboratively with the Network of Women and other associations internally and externally providing a family focus for the Network.

Aims and Achievements of the Gay Police Association
The GPA's objectives were to:
 Promote equal opportunities for gay and bisexual men and women in the police service
 Offer advice and support to gay and bisexual men and women in the police service and
 Improve relations between the police service and the wider gay community.

One of GPA's achievements was persuading, in 2003, most Chief Constables to allow gay Police Officers to march in uniform in 'Gay Pride' marches. Traditionally, Police Officers have not been permitted to wear uniform on marches or demonstrations that might be controversial or in any way 'political', but most Chief Constables agreed that Pride was a legitimate celebration of LGBT life and culture and by participating in uniform, could demonstrate the diversity within modern day Police Forces. Gay policemen and women first marched in full uniform in the London Gay Pride March on 26 July 2003. At the time, the GPA issued the following press release: "The Gay Police Association, a staff association recognised by the Metropolitan Police Service, sought permission for officers to attend the Gay Pride march in uniform. It was decided that it would be acceptable for officers to do so, subject to some safeguards. The safeguards relate mainly to risks that may arise by having off duty officers in uniform at an event policed by officers wearing uniform. The safeguards deal with these risks". Now the police are joined by the other emergency services and members of the Armed Forces, in uniform.

2006 advertisement controversy

In 2006, an advert by the Gay Police Association in The Independent attracted a record number of complaints, mainly from Christians and Christian organisations many of whom organised a campaign against the advert and urged people to complain to the ASA. The GPA agreed to withdraw the advert as a result of the findings of the Advertising Standards Authority (ASA). The GPA advert showed a Bible lying next to a pool of blood, accompanied by the following text: "In the last 12 months, the Gay Police Association has recorded a 74% increase in homophobic incidents, where the sole or primary motivating factor was the religious belief of the perpetrator". Over 500 separate complaints about the advert were made, the highest number for any advert that year.

The ASA upheld three classes of complaints. First, the advert was considered to be "likely to cause offence to those readers who were Christian" and breached Clause 5.1 of the Code of Advertising Practice. Second, the advert, "by featuring spilled blood prominently, wrongly suggested that all the reported incidents involved physical injury" and breached Clause 7.1 of the Code. Third, the GPA was unable to substantiate the claims made in the advert – a further breach of the Code, this time of Clause 3.1. The ASA did not uphold the complaint that the advert implied that the Bible condoned anti-homosexual attacks or that the advert incited violence towards 'people of faith', especially Christians.

The ASA’s actions included "telling the GPA to ensure future campaigns were not presented in a way that could cause undue offence, reminding them that they should ensure the use of imagery did not send misleading messages to consumers, and asking them to ensure any statistics could be substantiated".

A statement from the GPA said that "The GPA never refused to supply any material, we made it clear to the ASA that as there was a criminal investigation underway so we could not supply the material." The ASA refused to allow more time for the GPA to supply requested material.

The Gay Police Association advert led to what the BBC described as a 'bitter row' between the Gay Police Association and the Christian Police Association.

A number of Christians attempted to have the GPA prosecuted using the rarely used common law offence of blasphemy. An attempt by Rev George Hargreaves to prosecute the GPA using public order legislation failed, as did an attempt to hold individual members of the GPA Executive Committee personally liable, using police discipline regulations. At the time, some critics accused the Christians who made these prosecution attempts of hypocrisy, as vocal Christians – such as Stephen Green of Christian Voice – have been quoted in defence of freedom of speech/expression on other occasions.

The Gay Police Association's view is that verbal abuse and physical assault against gay men and women constitute criminal offences and should be reported to the police. Discrimination against gay people in the workplace is also unlawful and the GPA say all such discrimination should be reported to employers, who have a legal duty of care to prevent it.

Matthew Windibank Award

After one of the GPA founding members Matthew Windibank died in March 1999, an award was commissioned in his name. Windibank then commissioned Varun Mehta as the new Gay Police Association commissioner, which he happily fulfilled. The award recognises individuals and organisations that have made an outstanding contribution to the progression of LGBT equality issues inside and outside the police service. Matthew Windibank committed suicide by lethal injection of insulin in a Brighton hotel after a long-standing relationship broke down. He was never a Police Officer; he was employed by the police as full-time civilian race relations adviser.
 
 2001, National Advisory Group (NAG), for Policing Lesbian & Gay Communities
 2002, Paul Kelly, Chairman, Greater Manchester Police Federation Joint Branch Board
 2003, Simon Taylor, Assistant Chief Constable, Norfolk Constabulary
 2004, Dave McFarlane, National Coordinator of the National Black Police Association
 2005, Peter Tatchell, OutRage!
 2006, Paddy Tomkins, Chief Constable, Lothian and Borders Police
 2007, Richard Kirker, general secretary of the Lesbian and Gay Christian Movement.

References

External links
 UK National LGBT+ Police Network
 Scottish LGBTI Police
 European Gay Police Association
 French Gay Police Association : Flag !

"Gay Police Hero Victim of Hate Crime" LAGPA historical hate Crime article
 "Gay Police in 'anti-religion' probe" GPA historical article
 "Gay and Christian Police Officers in row over advert" GPA historical article
"History of the Scottish LGBTI Police Association" Scottish LGBTI Police Association history
"Message From Co-Chairs LGBT police UK" Message from Co-Chairs of LGBT Police UK.

Law enforcement in the United Kingdom
Defunct LGBT organisations in the United Kingdom
1990 establishments in the United Kingdom
Organizations established in 1990